My Lady Incog is a 1916 American silent film produced by Famous Players Film Company and distributed by Paramount. It was directed by Sidney Olcott with Hazel Dawn in the leading role.

Cast
Hazel Dawn - Nell Carroll
George Majeroni - René Lidal
Robert Cain - Teddy De Veaux
Dora Mills Adams - Mrs. De Veaux
Franklyn Hanna - Chief of Police
Frank Wunderlee - Bull Rice

Production Links
The film was shot in Palm Beach, Florida.

External links

 My Lady Incog website dedicated to Sidney Olcott

1916 films
American silent feature films
Films directed by Sidney Olcott
1916 comedy-drama films
1910s English-language films
American black-and-white films
1910s American films
Silent American comedy-drama films